Sandylake is a hamlet east of Lostwithiel in Cornwall, England. It is on the A30 main road.

References

Hamlets in Cornwall